Mighty Morphin Power Rangers: The Movie is the title of four different video game adaptations of the film of the same name which were released for the Super NES, Genesis, Game Boy and Game Gear. While the games were ostensibly based on the film, they also featured characters and plot elements from the second season of the original TV series. Like the previous game versions of the original Mighty Morphin Power Rangers, none of the four versions of the movie game were ports of each other.

Super NES

The Super NES version is a side-scrolling action game similar to the previous SNES game based on the series. The game can be played by one or two players with six available characters. Billy and Kimberly return from the previous game along with the introduction of Tommy, as the White Ranger (opposed to appearing as Green Ranger), and three new rookie rangers, Rocky, Adam, and Aisha, who replace Jason, Zack, and Trini from the original.

The player begins each stage as his or her character's civilian persona. The player can fill up a "Morphing meter" next to their life gauge by picking up thunderbolt-shaped items (whether by small ones or morphing sign bolts). These objects are dropped by enemies and can also be used to perform a special attack when the character is morphed or not. When Morphed, the Ranger gains a powered up kick as well as his or her signature weapon, the latter can be used in a special attack to deal great damage to a boss, or defeat weaker enemies and severally weakened bosses by pressing the special attack button. Once the Morphin' meter is filled, the player can press the special attack button to morph; an animated sequence begins showing the rangers morphing in a digitized video (based on the Season 2's transformation without showing the Red Ranger helmet configuring at the end). The method also occurs automatically after the player goes throughout the mission in civilian mode encountering the boss triggering the morph sequence (regardless of how much energy of the morphin' meter is filled up). A Special code made for the game can have the players begin the stages as the morphed Rangers instead of their civilian persona.

The game consists of seven stages. The player fights against Lord Zedd's Putty Patrol until reaching the end of stage boss. The first five bosses are all monsters from the TV show's second season, while the sixth one is an original creation for the game. The final boss is Ivan Ooze, the film's antagonist. Unlike the first game, there are no Megazord battles in this version, although the Ninja Megazord from the film (and the show's third season) makes an appearance during the ending sequence.

The four reviewers of Electronic Gaming Monthly considered the game a mediocre Final Fight clone which has decent graphics but suffers from a lack of variety of both moves and enemies. They scored it a 5.875 out of 10. In contrast, GamePro commented "With better gameplay, better Ranger graphics, and two-player simultaneous action, this sequel's perfect for fanatic fans and a fun once-through for other gamers." They particularly praised the multi-plane action, the simultaneous two player mode, and the accessible difficulty and controls.

Genesis

The Genesis version is a side-scrolling beat-'em-up that can be played by up to two players, where the player can control both the Rangers themselves and their Zords (depending on the level). The game consists of six stages, with the first two stages and the final one covering events from the film, whereas stages 3 to 5 are set before the events of the film and adapts key episodes from the TV show's second season (namely "White Light", "Ninja Encounter", and "Power Transfer"). The game's soundtrack, composed by Hikoshi Hashimoto, features hard rock arrangements of Ron Wasserman's original TV themes.

The game contains a total of nine rangers: Tommy, Adam, Kimberly, Billy, Aisha, Rocky, Zach, Trini, and Jason. When selecting Jason, Zach, and Trini, the voice clips of Adam, Aisha, and Rocky are heard when calling out their respective Zord name as their morphing command. The reason for this is because the original actors for them were released from contract after the events of the Power Transfer two-parter episode of Mighty Morphin' Power Rangers. Sega and Banpresto asked for permission from Saban Entertainment to use their characters but have the three replacements use their voices instead of Jason, Trini, and Zach. There are cinematic scenes in digitized form that are abridged from the movie and some from Season 2 of the show. Lord Zedd, Goldar, the Putty Patrol, and Oozemen appear as sub-enemies. Nimrod the Scarlet Sentinel, AC, and DC are renamed in this title as Sentinel Neck, Sentinel Ear, and Sentinel Ring respectively. Players also can fight the Ecto-Morphicons using Ninja Megazord or Falcon Zord (both by 2-Player mode; Thunder Megazord and Mega Tigerzord against the Sentinels). Bulk and Skull also appear as cameos in the game's ending.

Game Boy
The Game Boy version is a single-player side-scrolling action game similar to the SNES version. The player can choose to play as any of the six rangers, who will start off each stage as a Ninja Ranger. Rocky, Billy, and Tommy are the stronger characters, while Adam, Kimberly, and Aisha are more agile. By defeating enemies throughout each stage, mainly Putty Patrols, and accumulating enough Thunderbolt items to fill up the power gauge, the player can transform their character into a Power Ranger. Filling up the power gauge again while in Power Ranger mode will allow the player to perform a super attack. The game consists of six stages. The first five stages can be played in any order, while the sixth one can only be played after completing the other five.

GamePro commented in their review that "mediocre music, miniature graphics, and horrible control make this one of the worst Ranger titles to date." They particularly criticized that the stages are all similar and predictable and that without the Super Game Boy it is impossible to even differentiate between the different playable characters. The four reviewers of Electronic Gaming Monthly were divided about the game; two of them described it as "excessively lame", while the other two found it "surprisingly good", praising its length and precise controls. However, all four commented that the collision detection is poor, with attacks passing through enemies, and that the lack of any difference between the playable characters besides color is a letdown. They scored it a 6.875 out of 10.

Game Gear
The Game Gear version is a competitive fighting game, like the original "Game Gear" game, with the same gameplay format and game modes. One change that has been made from the previous is the addition of a thunderbolt-shaped power indicator next to the life gauge that gradually fills up during the course of battle until it begins to flash; during such instances, the player can perform a super move in addition to the standard special moves. The Game Gear version's soundtrack is made up of mostly midi versions of music from the series and Mighty Morphin Power Rangers The Album: A Rock Adventure.

The Story Mode consists of six stages with the first three stages being based on episodes from the second season of the TV show and the remaining three being based on the movie. In the first three stages, the player fights the first segment as one of the six Power Rangers from the TV show as they fight a series of Putty Patrols until confronting the stage boss. The second segment consists of a giant monster battle between the Thunder Megazord and the stage boss. The fourth stage is exclusively a Ranger battle against Ivan's Ooze men, while the final two stages are giant monster battles where the player controls the Ninja Mega Falconzord.

Scary Larry of GamePro commented that while the Power Rangers IP is childish, the game itself is solidly designed and so would appeal to Power Rangers fans. He said that the graphics and sounds are mediocre in absolute terms, but better than those of most Game Gear games.

See also
 Mighty Morphin Power Rangers (video game)
 Mighty Morphin Power Rangers: The Fighting Edition

References

External links
Game Gear, Game Boy, Genesis, and SNES versions at MobyGames

1995 video games
Bandai games
Banpresto games
Beat 'em ups
Cooperative video games
Game Boy games
Game Boy-only games
Mighty Morphin Power Rangers
Natsume (company) games
Video games about ninja
Power Rangers video games
Game Gear games
Sega Genesis games
Side-scrolling beat 'em ups
Super Nintendo Entertainment System games
Superhero video games
Fighting games
Video games based on films
Video games developed in Japan
Video games featuring female protagonists
Video games scored by Hiroyuki Iwatsuki
Video games set in California
Video games based on adaptations